The Simiganj (Simiganch) is a short, 27 km, river in western Tajikistan, central Asia.

It rises from an elevation of about 3000 meters on the southwestern slopes of a mountain in the Gissar Range, flows past the town of Simiganj and enters the Kofarnihon River at the city of Vahdat.

Notes

Rivers of Tajikistan